The Men's Sailboard (Lechner A-390) Competition at the 1992 Summer Olympics was held from 27 July to 4 August 1992, in Barcelona, Spain. Seven races were scheduled. 45 sailors, on 45 boats, from 45 nations competed.

Results

Notes

References 
 
 
 
 
 
 
 

Lechner A-390 Men's
Lechner A-390
Men's events at the 1992 Summer Olympics